Henrik Rummel (born September 26, 1987 in Copenhagen) is a Danish-born American rower. While attending Pittsford Mendon High School, Rummel rowed for Pittsford Crew on the Erie Canal in Pittsford, New York. He is a graduate of Harvard University.

During the 2012 Summer Olympics, he competed for the United States in the coxless four and won the bronze medal.

References

External links
 
 
 
 

1987 births
Living people
American male rowers
Rowers at the 2012 Summer Olympics
Rowers at the 2016 Summer Olympics
Rowers from Copenhagen
Olympic bronze medalists for the United States in rowing
Harvard University alumni
American people of Danish descent
Medalists at the 2012 Summer Olympics
World Rowing Championships medalists for the United States